Town and Country (often referred to locally as 'Lynwood') is a census-designated place (CDP) in Spokane County, Washington, United States. The population was 5,068 at the 2020 census.

Geography

Town and Country is located at  (47.721441, -117.421383). According to the United States Census Bureau, the CDP has a total area of 1.2 square miles (3.6 km2), all of it land.

The city of Spokane surrounds the CDP on three sides: the east, south and west. The city's street grid continues into Town and Country uninterrupted in the east, though it breaks down in the west along the bluff leading up to Five Mile Prairie. The bulk of the CDP lies on flat ground like the surrounding north side of Spokane. Along the west, however, the terrain rises rapidly from Town and Country's elevation of roughly 2,000 feet to over 2,300 at the crest over less than 1,000 feet of distance in places.

As is the case with the city of Spokane to the east and south, Town and Country blends into its neighbor to the north, the CDP of Country Homes, Washington, seamlessly.

Francis Avenue, carrying Washington State Route 291, serves as Town and Country's southern border, beyond which lies the North Hill neighborhood. Cedar Road is the western border, beginning on the flatland and then climbing the bluff towards the crest and into Five Mile Prairie. Most of the northern border with Country Homes runs along Country Homes Boulevard. Division Street, carrying U.S. Route 2 was the eastern border until 2008, when the city of Spokane annexed some of Town and Country. Division is still the eastern border from Country Homes Boulevard south to Lincoln Road. South of Lincoln the border works its way around the Holy Cross Cemetery, which used to be part of Country Homes, before following Atlantic Street, which runs parallel to and one block to the west of Division, for the four southernmost blocks of the CDP.

Most of Town and Country is zoned as low density residential, but there are commercial zones along Francis Avenue in the south and Division Street on the east.

Demographics
As of the census of 2020, there were 5,068 people and 2,109 households residing in the CDP, with an average of 2.56 persons per household. The population density was 4,223.3 people per square mile. The racial makeup of the CDP was 89.2% White, 1.3% African American, 0.1% Native American, 1.3% Asian, 0.0% Pacific Islander, and 7.4% from two or more races. Hispanic or Latino of any race were 6.9% of the population.

In the CDP, the age distribution of the population showed 25.2% under the age of 18 and 16.1% who were 65 years of age or older. Females made up 51.4% of the population. Of those age 16 and above, 66.7% were in the workforce, with 57.3% of females age 16+ in the workforce. 

The median income for a household in the CDP was $66,911. The per capita income for the CDP was $28,608. 9.2% of the population were below the poverty line. Median value of owner-occupied homes was $212,300, with 75.0% of homes being owner-occupied. Median rent in the CDP was $1,143.

Education
Town and Country is split between two school districts, with Spokane Public Schools serving the southern half of the CDP and the Mead School District serving the north. Linwood Elementary, part of Spokane Public Schools, is located in Town and Country. It feeds into Salk Middle School and then into Shadle Park High School. Evergreen Elementary, part of the Mead School District, is also located in Town and Country. It feeds into Highland Middle School and then into Mead High School.

Transportation

Highway

  - U.S. 2 - to  Newport (north) and Spokane (south)

U.S. 2 passes north–south along the eastern boundary of Town and Country on Division Street.

  - U.S. 395 - to  Colville (north) and Spokane (south)

U.S. 395 passes north–south along the eastern boundary of Town and Country along Division Street.

  - State Route 291 - to Tumtum (north) and Spokane (south)

State Route 291 passes along the southern boundary of Town and Country on Francis Avenue.

Surface streets
The three highways serving Town and Country all travel along surface streets and none are classified as limited-access in the area. Francis Avenue and Division Street are classified by the city of Spokane as major arterials, the city's highest classification for a surface street. While the city does not classify streets that lie entirely within Town and Country, it does consider the streets which connect to and serve as extensions of Country Homes Boulevard once it passes into the city limits to be major arterials as well. Country Homes Boulevard links the Maple/Ash couplet in the southwest with Division Street at a major intersection known as "the Y" in the northeast, making it a major thoroughfare in the neighborhood. It carried 26,400 vehicles per day in 2018, making Country Homes Boulevard one of unincorporated Spokane County's busiest roadways.

Dedicated bike lanes run on Wall Street, Country Homes Boulevard and Lincoln Road, and Cedar Road is classified as a shared roadway bike route.

Public transit
Town and Country is served by the Spokane area's public transit provider, the Spokane Transit Authority, which runs four fixed-route bus lines through the CDP. The Country Homes Park & Ride is located across the street to the north of the CDP and the Five Mile Park & Ride is one block to the south of the CDP.

References

Census-designated places in Spokane County, Washington
Census-designated places in Washington (state)